The Complejo Deportivo Torrimar is a 1,000-seat multi-sport facility in Guaynabo, Puerto Rico.  It is accessible by the Tren Urbano via Torrimar station.

History
The official opening ceremony for the football facility took place on March 3, 2011. At a cost of approximately $100,000, it was the first municipal football facility opened in Guaynabo. In 2019 the football stadium underwent a half million dollar renovation that included the installation of artificial turf.

References

External links
Soccerway profile

Football venues in Puerto Rico